Culion is a 2019 historical drama film directed by Alvin Yapan, starring Iza Calzado, Jasmine Curtis-Smith, and Meryll Soriano. Set in the 1940s, it tells the story of three women seeking a cure of leprosy. The name derives from the eponymous island in Palawan once known as a major leper colony.

Synopsis 
Three women afflicted with leprosy live a life of stigmatization in Culion at a time when the disease is considered a life sentence.

Cast

Main cast

Special guest appearance
 John Lloyd Cruz

Supporting cast

Production
Culion was produced under iOptions Ventures Corp. which is owned by Palawan-based businesspersons Peter and Gilie Sing. The film is the first produced by the production studio. Culion was directed by Alvin Yapan with the script made by Ricky Lee, the cinematography by Neil Daza, and the production by Mark Shandii Bacolod.

The production team sought consent from the local leaders and residents of Culion to produce their film on the island and promised to have the film screened first on the island. They also secured an endorsement from Dr. Arturo Cunanan Jr., head of the Culion Sanitarium and General Hospital, and Virginia de Vera, the town's mayor. Filming took two weeks with a crew of about 150 people.

Release 
The film had its world premiere at Culion, Palawan on December 14, 2019, in honor of the island's past. It had a wider release on December 25, 2019 as one of the eight entries of the 2019 Metro Manila Film Festival.

Reception

Accolades

See also 
 Culion
 Culion leper colony
 Leprosy
 Leprosy stigma

References

External links 
 Official Facebook page
 

2019 films
Filipino-language films
Philippine historical films
Films set in Palawan
Films set in the 1940s
Films about infectious diseases
Works about leprosy